Jinshi is a town in Santai County, Sichuan, China. , it has one residential community and 21 villages under its administration.

References

Towns in Sichuan
Santai County